Zurich (formerly, Alvord and Station) is a former settlement in Inyo County, California. It was a stop of the Carson and Colorado Railway.

Zurich was established in 1884 as Alvord, but was renamed in 1923 as Zurich for the jagged peaks of the nearby White Mountains, since during the winter, the snow on the mountain peaks reminded a local Swiss resident of the Alps. The town was established as the first stop of the Carson and Colorado Railway which ran to Keeler. When the railroad declined in the 1940s, so did Zurich, and it was finally abandoned in 1960 when the railroad shut down. Several building foundations are all that remain of Zurich. An historical plaque dedicates the site of the former town.

References

Former settlements in Inyo County, California
Former populated places in California
Owens Valley